Cepora eperia, the Sulawesi gull, is a butterfly in the family Pieridae. It is found on Sulawesi.

Subspecies
The following subspecies are recognised:
Cepora eperia eperia (Sulawesi)
Cepora eperia foa Fruhstorfer, 1897 (mountains of Sulawesi)
Cepora eperia flava Iwasaki & Yata, 2005 (Buton Island)

References

Pierini
Butterflies described in 1836
Butterflies of Indonesia
Taxa named by Jean Baptiste Boisduval